Minnesota State Highway 258 (MN 258) was a  highway in southwest Minnesota, which ran from its intersection with County State-Aid Highway 17 in Comfrey north to its northern terminus at U.S. Highway 14 in Burnstown Township, four miles east of Springfield.

Route description
Highway 258 served as a north–south connector route in southwest Minnesota between the town of Comfrey and U.S. Highway 14.

Highway 258 crossed the Little Cottonwood River near its intersection with County State-Aid Highway 20 in Bashaw Township.  The route crossed the Cottonwood River near its intersection with County State-Aid Highway 24 in Burnstown Township.

History
Highway 258 was authorized on July 1, 1949.  The route was paved in 1951.  On April 15, 2013, the route was turned over to Brown County.  The entire route is now designated and marked as Brown County State-Aid Highway 16.

Major intersections

References

External links

Highway 258 at the Unofficial Minnesota Highways Page

258